Waveform Records is an American record label founded in 1994 in Sedona, Arizona with subsequent stops in the San Francisco Bay Area in Mill Valley, Austin, San Diego and currently now on Maui. Waveform specializes in a "sensual and stimulating genre of chill and ambient music" that the label calls "exotic electronica".

They are perhaps best known for a widely influential series of ambient dub compilations in the mid-1990s: One A.D., Two A.D., Three A.D., and Four A.D.

Notable artists
 Higher Intelligence Agency
 Liquid Zen
 Loop Guru
 Phutureprimitive
 Sounds from the Ground
 Tuu

See also
 List of record labels

References

External links
 
 

Record labels established in 1994
Indie rock record labels
Electronica